Janubiy Olamushuk is an urban-type settlement in Andijan Region, Uzbekistan. It is part of Jalaquduq District. The town population was 6,184 people in 1989, and 7,900 in 2016.

References

Populated places in Andijan Region
Urban-type settlements in Uzbekistan